Petalida ("limpet"), also known as Xera (pronounced Ksera), is an islet close to the northern coast of Crete in the Aegean Sea. It is located between the island of Imeri Gramvousa and the mainland. Administratively, it is located within the municipality of Kissamos, in Chania regional unit.

See also
List of islands of Greece

Landforms of Chania (regional unit)
Uninhabited islands of Crete
Mediterranean islands
Islands of Greece